Riley Carter Millington (born 1993/1994) is an English actor known for playing Kyle Slater in the BBC soap opera EastEnders in 2015–2016. He was the first trans man to play a regular transgender character in British soap history. The Independent on Sunday, in its 2015 "Rainbow List", named Millington the most influential LGBTI person in the UK, making him the first trans man to top the list. The judges stated him playing Kyle "could help trans people – even save lives – and represents a landmark cultural moment."

In January 2017, Millington appeared in TLC's Celebrity Fat Fighters series.

In 2018, marking 100 years of the end of World War One, Millington appeared as Evans in the stage adaptation by of Birdsong, a novel written by Sebastian Faulks, travelling the length and breadth of the UK with Mesh Theatre Company.

Early life
Millington, from Stretford, studied drama at Eccles Sixth Form Centre and on the BA (Hons) Acting at the University of Central Lancashire before being cast in EastEnders. His character, Kyle, is also transgender. Millington's casting was praised by presenter Paris Lees as "the biggest thing to happen for the transgender community in Britain this decade. ... As a pop culture moment this is massive and a sign of the times."

Personal life
Millington has been engaged to Carlene Holton since 2018.

Filmography

Television

References

External links

See also

Living people
Transgender male actors
21st-century English male actors
20th-century LGBT people
21st-century LGBT people
English LGBT actors
English male soap opera actors
1990s births
People from Stretford
Male actors from Greater Manchester